South East Mutton Bird Islet is a steep unpopulated islet located close to the south-western coast of Tasmania, Australia. The South East Mutton Bird Islet is part of the Southwest National Park and the Tasmanian Wilderness World Heritage Site.

Fauna
The islet is part of the Port Davey Islands Important Bird Area, so identified by BirdLife International because of its importance for breeding seabirds. Recorded breeding seabird species are the short-tailed shearwater (250 pairs), fairy prion (1000 pairs), black-faced cormorant and silver gull.

See also

 List of islands of Tasmania

References

Islands of South West Tasmania
Protected areas of Tasmania
Important Bird Areas of Tasmania
Tasmanian Wilderness World Heritage Area